Shagriar may refer to:
 Nalbandyan, Armenia, formerly Mets Shagriar ("Big Shagriar")
 Pokr Shagriar, Armenia, ("Little Shagriar")